Living Newspaper is a term for a theatrical form presenting factual information on current events to a popular audience.  Historically, Living Newspapers have also urged social action (both implicitly and explicitly) and reacted against naturalistic and realistic theatrical conventions in favor of the more direct, experimental techniques of agitprop theatre, including the extensive use of multimedia. Living Newspapers originated in Russia during the Bolshevik Revolution,

The English term is most often associated with the Living Newspapers produced by the Federal Theatre Project.  Part of the federally funded arts program established under the Works Progress Administration in the United States of the 1930s, the Federal Theatre Project wrote and presented a number of Living Newspapers on social issues of the day, including Triple-A Plowed Under, Injunction Granted, One-Third of a Nation,  Power, and Spirochete.  Controversy over the political ideology of the Living Newspapers contributed to the disbanding of the Federal Theatre Project in 1939, and a number of Living Newspapers already written or in development were never performed, including several that addressed race issues.

History of the FTP's Living Newspapers

Establishment of the NY Living Newspaper Unit and Ethiopia

The Living Newspaper program began very shortly after the establishment of the Federal Theatre Project (FTP).  Following her appointment as National Director of the FTP in July 1935, Hallie Flanagan, a professor and playwright at Vassar College, and playwright Elmer Rice set to work planning the organization and focus of the FTP.  The New York Living Newspaper Unit (which performed at the Biltmore Theatre) came from this meeting. Allied with the American Newspaper Guild, this first and most active of the Living Newspaper Units employed out-of-work journalists and theatre professionals of all types, providing hourly wages for many reporters and entertainers left unemployed by the Depression.

The research staff of the Living Newspaper Unit quickly compiled their first Living Newspaper, Ethiopia, which went into rehearsal in 1936.  It never opened to the public.  The federal government issued a censorship order prohibiting the impersonation of heads of state onstage; the order effectively scuttled the production, which dramatized the invasion of Ethiopia by Italy and featured Italian dictator Benito Mussolini and other real-life figures prominently as characters.  Elmer Rice withdrew from the FTP in protest.

Controversy: Triple-A Plowed Under and Injunction Granted

Left with no script and the pressing need to provide its performers with a play, the Unit drew up another Living Newspaper, Triple-A Plowed Under, within a matter of weeks.  Morale had dropped after the cancellation of Ethiopia, and the original director of Triple-A Plowed Under left in frustration; Joseph Losey, known for his support of the Communist Party and recently returned from a visit to Moscow, replaced him.  Triple-A Plowed Under dramatized the plight of Dust Bowl farmers and suggested that farmers and workers unite to cut out the "middlemen" – dealers and other commercial interests.  The "Triple-A" in the title came from the Agricultural Adjustment Act of 1933, which the play criticized.   Like other Living Newspapers to follow, it employed the "Voice of the Living Newspaper," a disembodied voice which commented on and narrated the action; shadows; image projections; elaborate sound design, with sound effects and music; abrupt blackouts and scene changes; and other non-realistic devices to keep the audiences' attention and support the message of the play.

A minor Living Newspaper, Events of 1935, followed Triple-A Plowed Under.  A collage of scenes from many 1935 news events, ranging from celebrity gossip to major legal cases, 1935 ran for only 34 performances.  Cosgrove identifies it as the "least successful" of all the Living Newspapers.

Though Triple-A had clearly criticized government decisions and supported the laborer over the "merchant," the Unit's third Living Newspaper, also directed by Losey, explicitly supported workers' organizations and angered members of the federal government.  Injunction Granted, which opened four months after the close of Triple-A, lampooned big business men such as H. J. Heinz and newspaper baron William Randolph Hearst and called for unions to join the Congress of Industrial Organizations (CIO), a major, militant workers' association.  It aroused government concern during rehearsal; and Hallie Flanagan urged Losey to re-write parts of the script, but the play made it to the stage largely unaltered.  The piece ran on over-the-top satire and explicit bias: Heinz was introduced holding a giant pickle; Dean Jennings of the Newspaper Guild trounced Hearst in a boxing match; and a clown (played by actor Norman Lloyd) served as master-of-ceremonies for the entire production, according to Cosgrove.  Injunction Granted drew massive criticism and closed early.  Losey soon left the Unit and the FTP, though Flanagan offered to give him another chance.

The turnaround: Power and One-Third of a Nation

With the censorship of Ethiopia and the negative reaction to Injunction Granted, the Living Newspaper Unit had twice attracted criticism from the government that funded it.  In order to continue as a federal program, it became more retrospect and less politically radical in its choice of topics but did not give up its dedication to reportage on major social issues and calls for social change.

Its first production following Injunction Granted demonstrated this new emphasis.  Opening early in 1937, Power clearly supported the policies of the New Deal and the Works Progress Administration.  Power chronicled the search of the public consumer for affordable electric power and held up the Tennessee Valley Authority project as an example of where such power could come from. The play also introduced the "little man" figure to the Living Newspaper – a character who represented the consumer and the public, appearing throughout the play, asking questions and receiving explanations. Power garnered a positive reception, running for 140 performances and then converting to a scaled-down travelling form for outdoors summer performances throughout the city.

The next Living Newspaper also met with public and critical success. Over the summer of 1937, Flanagan oversaw the Federal Theatre Project Summer School at Vassar College; the forty theatre artists invited to this program developed the first version of a Living Newspaper on tenant housing which grew to become One-Third of a Nation.  In its finished form, One-Third of a Nation opened early in 1938 and ran for 237 performances, making it the most successful of the Living Newspapers. The play abandoned some of the experimental nature of the earlier Living Newspapers, using a very realistic set to display the filth and dangers of a tenant slum, but retained the episodic format and multimedia (sound, film, and image) displays that characterized the form.  The production received praise from critics and may have helped push through housing legislation.  It eventually opened in major cities throughout the country.

The end of the FTP and the Living Newspaper Unit

Despite its rising success and less radical tone, the tide of government opinion turned against the Federal Theatre Project – and the Living Newspapers in particular – in 1938. Established in this year, the House Un-American Activities Committee (HUAC) began an investigation of the FTP, focusing on its alleged Communist sympathies and anti-American propagandism. Flanagan defended the FTP and the Living Newspapers, holding that the program had presented propaganda, yes, but "... propaganda for democracy, propaganda for better housing," not propaganda against the government.  Despite her defense of the program and President Roosevelt's protests, Congress disbanded the FTP – and with it, the New York Living Newspaper Unit – on July 30, 1939.

The end of the FTP and the Unit left many complete and partially developed Living Newspaper scripts unperformed and unfinished.  Among these were three by African-American playwrights that dealt with race issues and racism, including Liberty Deferred, by Abram Hill and John Silvera, which followed the history of slavery in the U.S. and addressed the lynchings of African-Americans in the South.  Some historians suggest that Congress shut down the Federal Theatre Project partially to stifle the voices of African-American theatre professionals and criticism of racism in the U.S., or that the FTP delayed production of these plays out of fear of just such a reprisal.

The Living Newspaper project has influenced progressive theatre in the 21st Century. A good example of a theatre company performing in the style of the Living Newspaper is the progressive DC Theatre Collective whose piece, The Tea Party Project, was performed in Washington DC in July 2010.

Living Newspapers outside of New York

Though the New York Living Newspaper Unit produced most of the major Living Newspapers, other units in cities throughout the U.S. produced or planned Living Newspapers.  In most cases, these productions were local runs of the New York Living Newspapers.  Both Power and One-Third of a Nation ran throughout the U.S., with the scripts altered to various degrees to suit local conditions.  In Seattle, the mayor declared "Power Week" in honor of the week-long run of Power, recognizing the timeliness of the play's subject matter: With the public Bonneville hydroelectric project on the horizon, private and public power companies were vying for support in the city.

Non-New-York Units also researched and wrote their own Living Newspapers.  The Southwest Unit, in California, planned and researched Spanish Grant, on a historical incident in which a series of "speculative land deals" took land from communities, and Land Grant, on the 1848 cession of California to the United States and corrupt land deals that led up to it.  Washington's unit planned Timber; Iowa's Dirt; and Connecticut's Stars and Bars; however, none of these regional Living Newspapers ever made it to full production.

On the other hand, Chicago produced an original Living Newspaper that rivalled the later New York Living Newspapers in its impact and positive reception.  In 1938, Arnold Sundgaard's Spirochete, a Living Newspaper on the history of syphilis, opened in Chicago.  Using the image projections, extensive sound design, shadowplay, brief scenes, and "little man" character (here, a patient embodying all syphilis sufferers throughout history) made standard by the New York Unit, Spirochete followed syphilis from its introduction in Europe in the 15th century through to the social stigma surrounding it in the 1930s.  The play pushed for audiences to support the Marriage Test Law of 1937, which required blood tests for syphilis prior to marriage.  Spirochete became the second most produced Living Newspaper, after One-Third of a Nation and ran in four other major cities as part of a nationwide syphilis-education and -prevention campaign.

Style of the FTP's Living Newspapers

Though definitions of the Living Newspaper and its purpose, both within the Federal Theatre Project and at large, varied, certain characteristics united all of the FTP's Living Newspaper productions.

First, a Living Newspaper's content always centered on some current event or issue affecting the United States working class at large – whether it be the spread of syphilis, slum housing conditions, or the search for affordable electrical power.  Teams of research workers, many of whom were out-of-work journalists, carried out extensive research to provide the factual base for each Living Newspaper.  Editors then organized the information and turned it over to writers, who collectively assembled a Living Newspaper from this collage of facts, statistics, newspaper clippings, and anecdotes.  Though Hallie Flanagan repeatedly stated that Living Newspapers should be objective and unbiased, most Living Newspaper productions communicated a clear bias and a call for action from the watching audience.

Second, the FTP's Living Newspapers tended to break from realistic stage conventions in favor of non-naturalistic, experimental dramaturgy and stage design.  "Techniques Available to the Living Newspaper Dramatist," a guide compiled by the Federal Theatre Project in 1938, lists many of the elements that became characteristic of the Living Newspaper.  These included quick scene and set changes; flexibility of stage space, using many levels, rolling and hand-carried scenery, and scrims to establish a multitude of locations without elaborate constructed sets; projection of settings, statistics, and film; shadowplay; sound effects and full musical scores; the use of a loudspeaker to narrate and comment on the action; and abrupt blackouts and harsh spotlights.  The guide also suggests the use of puppetry, modern dance, and pantomime.  In terms of dramatic construction, the guide urges writers and designers to keep the concept of counterpoint in mind when constructing Living Newspapers—alternating quickly between scenes and voices displaying contrasting viewpoints, to comment on the action and keep the audience involved and aware.

Living Newspapers in Russia 

The developers of the Living Newspapers built upon theatrical forms they had encountered in Bolshevik Russia, Germany, and European workers' theatre. Living-Newspaper-like performances appeared in Bolshevik Russia as early as 1919, using a variety of devices (such as lantern slides, songs, newspaper readings, and film segments) to present news and propaganda to the illiterate. As the form matured in Russia, workers' groups put on highly regionalized Living Newspapers, treating issues of public interest and concern. Zhivaya Gazeta (the Russian term for "Living Newspaper") reached its peak from 1923 to 1928; Hallie Flanagan visited the country and witnessed workers' performances during this period, in 1926. The Blue Blouse theatre groups, which employed satire and demanding acrobatics to bring news to the public, particularly captured Flanagan's attention. The work of Russian theatre artists Vsevolod Meyerhold and Vladimir Mayakovsky, active during this time, also influenced the form, as did the work of German theatre artists Bertolt Brecht and Erwin Piscator.

See also
 Theatre of the Oppressed

Notes

References

 Cosgrove, Stuart.  Introduction.  Liberty Deferred and Other Living Newspapers of the 1930s.  Federal Theatre Project.  Ed. Lorraine Brown.  Fairfax: George Mason UP, 1989.  ix-xxv.
 Cosgrove, Stuart.  The Living Newspaper: History, Production, and Form.  Hull: University of Hull, 1982.
 George Mason University Special Collections & Archives.  "Federal Theatre Project Poster, Costume, and Set Design Slide Collection."  Special Collections & Archives: George Mason University Libraries.  George Mason University.  28 Oct. 2007 <>.
 Hill, Abram and John Silvera.  Liberty Deferred.  Liberty Deferred and Other Living Newspapers of the 1930s.  Ed. Lorraine Brown.  Fairfax: George Mason UP, 1989.  249–303.
 The Library of Congress.  American Memory.  13 Aug. 2007.  The Government of the United States.  28 Oct. 2007 <American Memory: Remaining Collections>.
 Nadler, Paul.  "Liberty Censored: Black Living Newspapers of the Federal Theatre Project."  African American Review 29 (1995): 615–622.
 O'Connor, John S.  "'Spirochete' and the War on Syphilis."  The Drama Review 21.1 (1977): 91–98.
 Witham, Barry B.  The Federal Theatre Project: A Case Study.  Cambridge Studies in American Theatre and Drama.  Ser. 20.  New York: Cambridge UP, 2003.

Further reading

 Arent, Arthur.  "'Ethiopia: The First 'Living Newspaper.'"  Educational Theatre Journal 20.1 (1968): 15–31.
 Cardran, Cheryl Marion. The Living Newspaper: Its Development and Influence. Charlottesville, Va., 1975. Print.
 Federal Theatre Project.  Federal Theatre Plays.  Ed. Pierre De Rohan.  New York: De Capo, 1973.
 Federal Theatre Project.  Liberty Deferred and Other Living Newspapers of the 1930s.  Ed. Lorraine Brown.  Fairfax: George Mason UP, 1989.
 Highsaw, Carol Anne.  A Theatre of Action: The Living Newspapers of the Federal Theatre Project.  Princeton: Princeton UP, 1988.
 Klein, Emily. "'Danger: men not working' Constructing citizenship with contingent labor in the Federal Theatre's Living Newspapers." Women & Performance: a journal of feminist theory 23.2 (2013): 193-211 https://doi.org/10.1080/0740770X.2013.815523
 McDermott, Douglas.  The Living Newspaper as a Dramatic Form.  Iowa City: State University of Iowa, 1964.

External links

 By the People, For the People: Posters from the WPA, 1936-1943 at the Library of Congress website; includes posters for Living Newspapers.
 The New Deal Stage: Selections from the Federal Theatre Project, 1935-1939, at the Library of Congress website; contains production materials from Power.
 New Deal Network; photo gallery contains images from Living Newspaper productions.
 George Mason University's Federal Theatre Project Collection website; contains posters for Living Newspapers.
 University of Texas at Austin's Living Newspaper Program website; contains contact information and resource guide for creating Living Newspapers in Middle and High School classrooms.
 University of Virginia Living Newspaper audiohistory website; contains an introduction about Living Newspapers, related newspaper headlines, and audio recordings of vocal reenactments from the play Triple-A Plowed Under, including the play in its entirety.

1930s
Cultural history of the United States
Docudrama plays
Federal Theatre Project
Journalism
Political theatre forms
Theatrical genres